The Tower of Ferringule is a Genoese tower located in the commune of Farinole (Haute-Corse) on the west coast of Cap Corse.

The tower was one of a series of coastal defences built by the Republic of Genoa between 1530 and 1620 to stem the attacks by Barbary pirates. The tower was built in 1562 and is included in a list compiled by the Genoese authorities in 1617 that records that the tower was guarded at night by two men who were paid by the village of Farinole.

In 1993 the tower was listed as one of the official historical monuments of France.

See also
List of Genoese towers in Corsica

Notes and references

External links
 Includes information on how to reach 90 towers and many photographs.

Towers in Corsica
Monuments historiques of Corsica